Gardner is a city in Johnson County, Kansas, United States.  As of the 2020 census, the population of the city was 23,287.  It is located inside of the Kansas City metropolitan area.

History
Gardner was founded where the Santa Fe Trail and the Oregon/California Trails divided. The Santa Fe Trail sent travelers southwest through Santa Fe and Albuquerque toward Los Angeles and San Diego. The Oregon/California Trails bore west for a few miles before turning north toward the Kansas River valley, followed the Big Blue River into present-day Nebraska, followed the Platte River west, and ultimately split in present-day Wyoming, Idaho or Utah.

Gardner was founded as a Free-Stater settlement in 1857. Settled primarily by emigrants from Massachusetts, it was named for Henry Gardner, then governor of Massachusetts. Four years after its establishment, it became the first community in Johnson County—and perhaps the first in the state—to experience an attack by Confederate forces.

The first post office in Gardner was established in 1858.

Geography
Gardner is located at  (38.812367, -94.918621).

Climate
The climate in this area is characterized by hot, humid summers and generally mild to cool winters.  According to the Köppen Climate Classification system, Gardner has a humid subtropical climate, abbreviated "Cfa" on climate maps.

Demographics

2010 census
As of the census of 2010, there were 19,123 people, 6,644 households, and 4,938 families living in the city. The racial makeup of the city was 89.7% White, 3.0% African American, 0.5% Native American, 1.9% Asian, 1.8% from other races, and 3.0% from two or more races. Hispanic or Latino of any race were 6.2% of the population.

There were 6,644 households, of which 49.7% had children under the age of 18 living with them, 58.9% were married couples living together, 10.3% had a female householder with no husband present, 5.1% had a male householder with no wife present, and 25.7% were non-families. 20.1% of all households were made up of individuals, and 5% had someone living alone who was 65 years of age or older. The average household size was 2.85 and the average family size was 3.31.

The median age in the city was 30 years. 33.2% of residents were under the age of 18; 6.6% were between the ages of 18 and 24; 37.7% were from 25 to 44; 17.1% were from 45 to 64; and 5.3% were 65 years of age or older. The gender makeup of the city was 49.9% male and 50.1% female.

2000 census
As of the census of 2000, there were 9,396 people, 3,307 households, and 2,460 families living in the city. The racial makeup of the city was 94.13% White, 1.21% African American, 0.49% Native American, 1.05% Asian, 0.01% Pacific Islander, 1.26% from other races, and 1.85% from two or more races. Hispanic or Latino of any race were 2.99% of the population. 26.8% were of German, 18.2% American, 11.5% Irish and 5.6% English ancestry according to Census 2000.

There were 3,307 households, out of which 47.8% had children under the age of 18 living with them, 58.5% were married couples living together, 11.1% had a female householder with no husband present, and 25.6% were non-families. 19.5% of all households were made up of individuals, and 5.6% had someone living alone who was 65 years of age or older. The average household size was 2.80 and the average family size was 3.23.

In the city, the population was spread out, with 33.1% under the age of 18, 8.4% from 18 to 24, 38.4% from 25 to 44, 13.7% from 45 to 64, and 6.4% who were 65 years of age or older. The median age was 29 years. For every 100 females, there were 96.9 males. For every 100 females age 18 and over, there were 93.7 males.

As of 2000 the median income for a household in the city was $50,807, and the median income for a family was $54,554. Males had a median income of $37,438 versus $27,553 for females. The per capita income for the city was $20,434. About 5.3% of families and 6.0% of the population were below the poverty line, including 6.1% of those under age 18 and 9.2% of those age 65 or over.

Economy
BNSF Railway built a refueling plant and office in Edgerton which is 3 miles from western Gardner. It opened in May 2013 and employs about 200.

Largest employers
According to the City's 2015 Comprehensive Annual Financial Report, the largest employers in the city are:

Government
The mayor of Gardner is Todd Winters, who was sworn in on December 6, 2021. The city council is made up of five (5) at-large members, each of whom serve rotating 4-year terms.

Education
Gardner is part of the USD 231 school district. Located in Gardner are six out of the seven elementary schools (Edgerton Elementary is the only school in the district not located in Gardner). These include Gardner Elementary, Sunflower Elementary, Madison Elementary, Nike Elementary, Grand Star Elementary, and Moonlight Elementary. The district also has three middle schools, Wheatridge, Trail Ridge, and Pioneer Ridge, and one high school (Gardner-Edgerton High School) all located in Gardner.

Library
The Johnson County Library maintains a branch in Gardner.

Notable people
Notable individuals who were born in and/or have lived in Gardner include:
 Ray McIntire (1918–1996), engineer, inventor
 Bubba Starling (1992– ), baseball center fielder
 John Means (1993– ), baseball pitcher

See also
 California Trail
 Oregon Trail
 Santa Fe Trail

References

Further reading

External links
 City of Gardner
 Gardner - Directory of Public Officials
 Gardner city map, KDOT

Cities in Kansas
Cities in Johnson County, Kansas
Cities in Kansas City metropolitan area
Populated places established in 1857
1857 establishments in Kansas Territory